Waldo Lategan (born 15 April 1989) is a South African first class cricketer. He was included in the South Western Districts cricket team for the 2015 Africa T20 Cup. Lategan since completed his level 3 umpiring course in South Africa, subsequently a proud member of the Western Province Cricket Umpires Association.

References

External links
 

1989 births
Living people
South African cricketers
South Western Districts cricketers
People from Oudtshoorn
Cricketers from the Western Cape